In animal behaviour, a gens (pl. gentes) or host race is a host-specific lineage of a brood parasite species. Brood parasites, such as cuckoos, which use multiple host species to raise their chicks evolve different gentes, each one specific to its host species. This specialisation allows the parasites to lay eggs that mimic those of their hosts, which in turn reduces the chances of the eggs being rejected by the hosts, with about 5% of well-matched eggs compared to 72% of mismatched eggs rejected.

The exact mechanisms of the evolution and maintenance of gens is still a matter of some research. However, it is believed that in common cuckoos, gens-specific properties are sex-linked and lie on the W chromosome of the female. Male cuckoos, which, like all male birds, have no W chromosome, are able to mate with females of any gens, and thereby maintain the cuckoo as one species.  This is not the case in other brood parasites, such as cowbirds, in which both the male and female imprint on their preferred host.  This leads to speciation, such as the indigo bird, which is suggested by the fact they have a more recent evolutionary origin than their hosts.

References

Davies, N. (2000) Cuckoos, Cowbirds and other Cheats. T. & A. D. Poyser: London 
Dawkins, R. (1982) The Extended Phenotype. Oxford University Press: Oxford 

Brood parasites
Parasitology